Seventh Summit Conference of Heads of State or Government of the Non-Aligned Movement on 7–12 March 1983 took place in New Delhi in India, one of the founders and leading members of the Non-Aligned Movement. The summit followed the 1979 summit in Havana, Cuba at which confrontation between moderate member states led by SFR Yugoslavia and India and radical states led by Cuba led the movement into crisis. The keynote address delivered by Prime Minister of India Indira Gandhi. At the summit in New Delhi Bahamas, Barbados, Colombia and Vanuatu were admitted as new member states, Papua New Guinea, Antigua and Barbuda as observers and Dominican Republic as an guest state. Cambodia was absent from the meeting due to rival delegations controversy, Saint Lucia failed to send a delegation while Luxembourg's request for an guest status was rejected on formalistic deadline grounds. 1,500 journalists followed the event.

Participants
The following states participated at the Summit in New Delhi:

Member states

 
 
 
 
 
 
 
 
 
 
 
 
 
 
 
 
 
 
 
 
 
 
 
 
 
 
 
 
 
 
 
 
 
 
 
 
 
 
 
 
 
 
 
 
 
 
 
 
 
 
 
 
 
 
 
 
 
 
 
 
 
 
 
 
 
 
 
 
 
 
 
 
 
 
 
 
 
  South West Africa People’s Organisation

Observers

 
 
 
 
 
 
 
 African National Congress
 Afro-Asian People's Solidarity Organisation
 
 Organization of African Unity
 Organization of the Islamic Conference
 Pan Africanist Congress of Azania
 Socialist Party of Puerto Rico

Guests

 
 
 
 
 
 
 
 
 
 
 Economic and Social Commission for Asia and the Pacific
 Food and Agriculture Organization
 Red Cross
 International Conference on the Question of Palestine
 United Nations Ad Hoc Committee on the Indian Ocean
 United Nations Commissioner for Namibia
 United Nations Cormnittee on the Exercise of the Inalienable Rights Of the Palestinian People
 United Nations Council for Namibia
 United Nations Conference on Trade and Development
 United Nations Development Program
 United Nations Educational Scientific and Cultural Organization
 United Nations Industrial Development Organization
 United Nations Special Committee against Apartheid
 Special Committee on Decolonization
 World Food Council
 World Health Organization

References

See also
 India and the Non-Aligned Movement
 Foreign relations of India
 Commonwealth Heads of Government Meeting 1983

Summit 7th
Foreign relations of India
New Delhi
Non-Aligned Movement Summit
Non-Aligned Movement Summit
Non-Aligned Movement Summit
Non-Aligned Movement Summit